Libaire is a surname. Notable people with the surname include:

 Jardine Libaire, American writer
 Adolphe Libaire (1840–1920), Captain in the Union Army